The 2014–15 UMass Lowell River Hawks men's ice hockey team represented the University of Massachusetts Lowell during the 2014–15 NCAA Division I men's ice hockey season. The team was coached by Norm Bazin, in his fourth season at UMass Lowell. The River Hawks played their home games at the Tsongas Center on campus in Lowell, Massachusetts, competing in Hockey East.

Personnel

Roster
As of November 9, 2014.

|}

Coaching staff

Standings

Schedule

|-
!colspan=12 style=""| Exhibition

|-
!colspan=12 style=""| Regular Season

|-
!colspan=12 style=""| Postseason

Rankings

References

UMass Lowell River Hawks men's ice hockey seasons
UMass Lowell River Hawks
UMass Lowell River Hawks
UMass
UMass